The 1898 college football season had no clear-cut champion, with the Official NCAA Division I Football Records Book listing Harvard and Princeton as having been selected national champions.

Conference standings

Major conference standings

Independents

Minor conferences

See also
 1898 College Football All-America Team

References